The Bahamas competed at the Paralympic Games from 1972 to 1988. It participated in every Summer Paralympics during those years and won a total of two silver and three bronze medals. The country never competed at the Winter Paralympics and has not appeared at any Paralympic Games since 1988.

Medalists

References